Clement Richardson (1878–December 1949) was an American professor, college president, and author. An African American, he served as president of Lincoln Institute in Jefferson City, Missouri from 1918 until 1922. He edited The National Cyclopedia of the Colored Race which includes a profile on him.

Early life and education 
Clement Richardson was born in 1878 in Halifax County, Virginia. He attended White Oak Grove Country School and tilled tobacco. He moved to Massachusetts for access to more education, initially working in tanning and farming, before attending the boy's school at Mount Hermon School (now Northfield Mount Hermon School). 

For three years he attended Brown University, before transferring. Richardson graduated from Harvard University in 1907, one six African Americans graduating that year.

Career 
Richardson worked as a correspondent for many newspapers and magazines including The Boston Daily Globe; work that continued throughout his entire life. 

He was the director of the department of English literature and rhetoric of Morehouse College in Atlanta in 1908. In 1908, Richardson joined the faculty of Tuskegee Institute (now Tuskegee University) as the head of the English department. He wrote a pamphlet titled "Extension Work" while at Tuskegee Institute. 

From 1918 to 1922, Richardson served as the president of Lincoln Institute. Lincoln Institute became Lincoln University during his tenure as its president. In 1919, he was participant at a convention of African American educators in Jefferson City, many of the presentations were affiliated to the Negro Educational Congress. In 1919, he missed a Negro State Teachers event due to coal shortages at the school and in Missouri.

In 1922 he was to visit Richmond, Virginia.

Clement Richardson Fine Arts Center and Auditorium
The Clement Richardson Fine Arts Center was building was constructed at Lincoln University in 1956. The auditorium / theater wing was under construction in 1958. The Arts Center has hosted events.

Writings
; about Tuskegee Institute's 34th year of existence

; about commencement as Tuskegee Institute various related events

The National Cyclopedia of the Colored Race, editor

Personal life 
Richardson was married in 1908 to Ida J. Rivers, and had four daughters. He died in December 1949.

See also
Inman E. Page, the first African American to serve as president of Lincoln Institute

References

1878 births
1949 deaths
Morehouse College faculty
Lincoln University (Missouri) faculty
Tuskegee University faculty
People from Halifax County, Virginia
Harvard University alumni
Northfield Mount Hermon School alumni